Clutha was a New Zealand parliamentary electorate from 1866 to 1996.

Population centres
In the 1865 electoral redistribution, the House of Representatives focussed its review of electorates to South Island electorates only, as the Central Otago Gold Rush had caused significant population growth, and a redistribution of the existing population. Fifteen additional South Island electorates were created, including Clutha, and the number of Members of Parliament was increased by 13 to 70.

This electorate covered South Otago and contained the settlements of Balclutha, Kaitangata, and Owaka. It was later enlarged to include much of the Bruce electorate, Including the town of Milton.

History
The first representative was James Macandrew, who had served on all previous parliaments. Mackenzie retired from Parliament at the end of the third term for Clutha in 1996.

The  was won by James Thomson, who thus started his second period of service. Thomson retired after three terms in 1905, and this was also the end of his political career.

 Alexander Malcolm 1905–22
 John Edie 1922–25
 Fred Waite 1925–31
 Peter McSkimming 1931–35

In the 1996 election, the first MMP election, the electorate was combined with the adjacent Wallace electorate into the Clutha-Southland electorate.

Members of Parliament
The electorate was represented by ten Members of Parliament:

Key

Election results

1958 supplementary election

 
 
 
 
 
 

On 26 November 1957, Bruce Waters, the Labour candidate for Clutha was admitted to Balclutha Public Hospital after a car collision. As a result Waters was unable to engage in any further election campaigning. Due to this development the National and Social Credit candidates cancelled their remaining campaign meetings. Waters died on 29 November causing the election to be delayed. On December 4, after the general election, the outgoing Prime Minister (Keith Holyoake) and incoming Prime Minister (Walter Nash) agreed that the election for Clutha would be held on 18 January. In the intervening time between when the election was scheduled for and the reassigned date one candidate withdrew, Bill Caldwell, who had previously intended to stand as an independent National candidate. Labour selected Joseph Fahey, a farmer from Lawrence, as Waters' replacement to contest the seat on 20 December. When the election was finally held, National candidate James Roy won by a margin of 2,172 votes.

1931 election

1928 election

1925 election

1899 election

1893 election

Notes

References

Historical electorates of New Zealand
Politics of Otago
1865 establishments in New Zealand
1996 disestablishments in New Zealand